is a female Japanese taekwondo practitioner, born in Daito. She won the silver medal in the women's flyweight (-49 kg) class at the 2010 Asian Taekwondo Championships held in Astana, Kazakhstan.

She competed in the 2012 Summer Olympics, reaching the quarterfinals, where she lost to eventual gold medallist Wu Jingyu.

Personal life
Kasahara was originally a karateka but converted her specialty to taekwondo in 2007. She currently attends at Daito Bunka University, majoring in English Literature.

References

External links
 
 

1990 births
Living people
Japanese female taekwondo practitioners
Asian Games medalists in taekwondo
Taekwondo practitioners at the 2012 Summer Olympics
Olympic taekwondo practitioners of Japan
Taekwondo practitioners at the 2010 Asian Games
Asian Games silver medalists for Japan
Medalists at the 2010 Asian Games
People from Daitō, Osaka
Asian Taekwondo Championships medalists
21st-century Japanese women